A comics anthology collects works in the medium of comics, typically from multiple series, and compiles them into an anthology or magazine. The comics in these anthologies range from comic strips that are too short for standalone publication to comic book chapters that might later be compiled into collected comic book volumes (such as manga tankobon and comic albums).

United States

Asia

Japan

Malaysia

Europe

Belgium and France

United Kingdom 

Britain has a long tradition of publishing comic anthologies, usually weekly (hence The Dandy going past 3,000 published issues).

See also
British comics, the majority of which are anthologies
British small press comics, many of which are also anthologies
List of manga magazines, the majority of which are anthologies

References

 
Comics terminology